Atiquipa District is one of thirteen districts of Caravelí Province in the Arequipa Region of Peru.

Environment
Atiquipa is located in the coastal desert of Peru, an almost rainless area. However, heavy fogs and mists, called garúa, permit vegetation to grow on the mountain slopes of the district. Conservation organizations are attempting to preserve and restore the environment of the lomas. Included in the project is the installation of fog-catching nets to capture water and thereby help the 80 families who live within the area to expand agriculture, primarily growing olives.

References

Districts of the Caravelí Province
Districts of the Arequipa Region